MacMullin Lake  is a lake of Cape Breton Regional Municipality, Nova Scotia, Canada.

MacMullin Lake is in the Framboise River watershed.
It is connected to MacArthurs Lake (CAWDS) by a channel.
Downstream it connects to Middle Lake.
The lake is visible through the trees from the Grand Mira North Road.

See also
List of lakes in Nova Scotia

References

Sources

Lakes of Nova Scotia